, Op. 39, is a song cycle composed by Robert Schumann. Its poetry is taken from Joseph von Eichendorff's collection entitled Intermezzo. Schumann wrote two cycles of this name – the other being his Opus 24, to texts by Heinrich Heine – so this work is also known as the Eichendorff Liederkreis. Schumann wrote, "The voice alone cannot reproduce everything or produce every effect; together with the expression of the whole the finer details of the poem should also be emphasized; and all is well so long as the vocal line is not sacrificed." Liederkreis, Op. 39, is regarded as one of the great song cycles of the 19th century, capturing, in essence, the Romantic experience of landscape.

Songs

The cycle consists of twelve songs:
 "In der Fremde"
 "Intermezzo"
 "Waldesgespräch"
 "Die Stille"
 "Mondnacht"
 "Schöne Fremde"
 "Auf einer Burg"
 "In der Fremde"
 "Wehmut"
 "Zwielicht"
 "Im Walde"
 "Frühlingsnacht"

"In der Fremde"

Form 
The form of "In der Fremde" is ambiguous: there are arguments that it is through-composed and that it is in the A–B–A form.

The evidence that "In der Fremde" is through-composed is found in both the melody and the harmony. The harmonic pattern is inconsistent enough to be through composed: The piece modulates from F minor, to A major, to B minor, then back to F minor. Within each of these keys, the general structure is comparable, but the last significant section (mm 22–28) is strikingly different. With each modulation, the melody changes. The modulations are not directly congruent with the stanza changes, which points to a through-composed piece.

It can be argued that "In der Fremde" takes an A–B–A–C form. Though they are in different keys, the first and third sections (A) have nearly the same melody and comparable harmonic structures. The second section (B) has all new melodic material and is in a major mode which contrasts with the A section. The final section is new material; it "echoes the last line of the first quatrain [and] stands in for a return of the entire quatrain”, but does not constitute a restatement of the A section.

The form could also be interpreted as A–B–A′ if the focus is predominantly on the vocal line. There is a recurring motif between the A and A′ sections, and the difference between the two sections can be found in sparse accidentals and different intervals that make the variations on the original motif. The big difference is the change in key, as the A′ section is in B minor before the song modulates back to the home key, F minor.

Text 
The text of this poem is simple in meaning. The speaker can be interpreted as either going to a forest or as already being in the forest, a place that is beautiful for its solitude. This poem is composed primarily of symbols that can be interpreted both literally and figuratively, the point this analysis will be pursuing. The red flashes of lightning are clearly aligned to show that his home life is no longer something that he feels safe calling his own. Since the lightning is red, a phenomenon that occurs rarely, if ever, in nature, one can imagine that the storm is not a literal one but rather something that is only occurring in his mind. This in mind, the death of the narrator's parents can serve as a metaphor. Instead of them actually being dead, the narrator is addressing them from a point of young narcissism. The narrator claims for the parents to not know their child anymore, but this is an interpretation of the parent's view of the child and how it is different from the child's self-perception. The forest serves as a place of peace for the narrator, giving them a refuge from a tumultuous home life.

In a more literal interpretation, the narrator seeks the solace of death, wishing to escape a life with nothing left to offer him. The poem portrays immense feelings of loneliness when he says "no one [at home] knows [him/her] anymore." No longer are his "long dead" Mother and Father there for him, and nor is there anybody at home for him. His descriptions of home include images of "lightning" and "clouds" that are "com[ing]". The second stanza shifts from describing the narrator's view of his home to his feelings about himself. While in the first stanza, the narrator depicts loneliness and the act of leaving behind any sense of home, the second stanza welcomes the "quiet time" with "rest" that he desires. The narrator expresses how he is resigned to his solitude and mortality. The loneliness of death is essentially an extension of the loneliness that the narrator already feels. The second stanza, while depicting the calm "rustle" of the forest, is more peaceful than the first, reflecting the relief that death would bring.

Setting to music 

Schumann opens this song cycle with the lied In der Fremde in F minor with arpeggiated chords in the piano. These broken chords impart a feeling of perpetual motion, reflecting the stormy scene set up by the narrator. The dynamics (mostly piano) suggest that the storm is far away, yet the sense of urgency is still present in the single line of continuous, moving 16th notes. In the conjunct vocal line we feel the loneliness the narrator feels as he remembers his parents and reflects on his struggle.

The first stanza is accompanied completely in F minor and ends with a perfect authentic cadence. Once the tone of the poem changes, the harmonic structure follows suit. At the beginning of the second stanza, Schumann modulates to A major to reflect the narrators hopeful longing for the "quiet time to come." The style of accompaniment in the A major section also changes, with a light and hopeful counter-melody in the right hand that stands in contrast to the metronomic urgency of the 16th notes. As the angst bleeds through from the pain of the realization that the narrator is alone, with no parents, the music lingers around the dominant in the uneasy A major. The applied chords in the beginning of this section help by tonicizing the dominant.

The A major section modulates to B minor, giving a dark and unexpected ending that transitions back into the home key. When we return to the home key of F minor there is a tonic pedal that helps drive the movement to a close, giving a harmonic grounding as the moving 16th notes continue. With the addition of Neapolitan chords in measures 22 and 24, we as listeners feel the tension and unease that the narrator feels as he returns to his dark, lonely thoughts and continues towards death.

Since Schumann composed this piece during the Romantic Period, the dynamics are extreme. The only dynamic markings in the entire piece are in measures 1 and 5, indicating a piano or pianissimo dynamic. Schumann's choice of such minimal dynamics reflect the narrator's quiet resignation and longing for death. Later, specifically in the A major section, there are some crescendos and diminuendos marked in the piano part. The piece also has a relatively smooth texture, since the piano is playing legato arpeggios and the voice is singing a flowing, conjunct melody.

This movement of Liederkreis has several applied chords, such as V/V. Almost exclusively, these applied chords do not resolve to the expected chord. Instead, they resolve to different chords with the same harmonic functions. Throughout, there are applied chords of both the dominant (V) and subdominant (iv), which resolve to vii° and a Neapolitan chord (N), respectively. This has the effect of creating unexpected harmonic tension, heightening the emotions of the narrator.

"Mondnacht"

Form 
It can be argued that the form of "Mondnacht" is strophic, with some slight deviations from the norm. The first two stanzas of the poetry are set to identical melodies in the vocal line, and there is also very strong similarity in the piano accompaniment, with only a few chords that differ. The digressions from the norm occur in the last stanza, where the vocal line varies in pitch, but retains the same rhythmic structure. Additionally, the repeated, blocked chords in the piano accompaniment become much thicker with the doubling of notes.

Text 

The line "She must only dream of him" is very interesting in translation, because it is not necessarily referring to a human female and a human male. In the German language, there are feminine and masculine definite articles, which refer to other nouns as well. Looking back to the original German text, the sky is masculine, while the Earth is feminine. Knowing this, perhaps von Eichendorff is trying to create a personified relationship of sorts between the two, saying the earth must "only dream" of the sky.

In the grander scheme of the poem, it can be said that von Eichendorff aimed to create an ethereal, dream-like scene, in order for the listener to understand the feelings of the narrator.

References

External links

 
 
 Texts of the songs, lieder.net

Song cycles by Robert Schumann
1840 compositions
Classical song cycles in German
Adaptations of works by Joseph von Eichendorff